Luther Gilyard Jr. (February 20, 1910 – September 20, 1976), sometimes listed as "Gillard", was an American Negro league first baseman in the 1930s and 1940s.

A native of Fort Smith, Arkansas, Gilyard made his Negro leagues debut in 1937 with the St. Louis Stars and Chicago American Giants. He played for Chicago again the following two seasons, and finished his career in 1942 with the Birmingham Black Barons. Gilyard died in Detroit, Michigan in 1976 at age 66.

References

External links
 and Seamheads
 Luther Gilyard at Arkansas Baseball Encyclopedia

1910 births
1976 deaths
Birmingham Black Barons players
Chicago American Giants players
St. Louis Stars (1937) players
20th-century African-American sportspeople
Baseball infielders